Barnwell  may refer to:

People
Barnwell (surname)

Places
Barnwell, Alberta, Canada
Barnwell, California, USA
Barnwell, Cambridgeshire, a suburb in north-east Cambridge, England
Barnwell Priory
Barnwell, Northamptonshire, England
Barnwell, South Carolina, USA

Other uses
Barnwell chronicler, the writer of thirteenth-century Latin chronicle named after the priory at Barnwell near Cambridge
Barnwell School, Stevenage, England

See also
 Banwell, Somerset, England
 Barwell, Leicestershire, England